Paddy Fahey (or Fahy, 22 August 1916 – 31 May 2019) was an Irish composer and fiddler who was considered one of the finest living composers of tunes that are in the style of traditional Irish music.

Fahey is from Kilconnell in East Galway. His music has a distinctive yearning, magical quality often referred to as "Draíocht". His music has been recorded by many of the finest traditional Irish musicians including Martin Hayes, Planxty, John Carty and Kevin Burke. In recent years, a few recordings featured Fahey's music prominently including recordings by Liz and Yvonne Kane and Breda Keville.

Fahey was something of an enigma in the traditional Irish music world in that he has never made a commercial recording despite the fact that he is an exceptional fiddler; nor has he published a book of his compositions. There are some privately made recordings of Fahey which have been distributed among musicians since the 1970s, and transcriptions of his tunes are found in many tune collections and on Internet resources such as www.thesession.org.

Fahey never gave his compositions names; instead they tend to be simply named "Paddy Fahey's Reel No.1", "Paddy Fahey's Jig No.2", etc. His known compositions number around 60 tunes, all of which are either jigs, reels or hornpipes.

In 2001 Fahey was named Composer of The Year by Irish Language TV station TG4 at their annual award ceremony 'Gradam Ceoil TG4'.  The award ceremony incorporated an extremely rare public performance with Paddy appearing alongside fellow fiddler Paddy Canny, harpist Máire Ní Chathasaigh, the band Altan and others.

He died in May 2019 at the age of 102.

Literary sources
Vallely, Fintan (ed.), The Companion to Traditional Irish Music. Cork University Press, Cork, 1999
Holohan, Maria. The Tune Compositions of Paddy Fahey. MA Thesis, University of Limerick, 1995

References

External links
RamblingHouse

1916 births
2019 deaths
21st-century violinists
Composers for fiddle
Irish centenarians
Irish fiddlers
Men centenarians
Musicians from County Galway